Latymer may refer to:

Schools in London
 The Latymer School, a co-educational grammar school in Edmonton
 Latymer Upper School, a co-educational independent school in Hammersmith
 Godolphin and Latymer School, an all-girls independent school in Hammersmith
 Latymer Preparatory School, a primary school associated with the Latymer Upper School foundation, Hammersmith
 Latymer All Saints Primary School, a primary school in the London Borough of Enfield

Other uses
 Latymer (surname)

See also
 
 Latimer (disambiguation)
 Lattimer (disambiguation)
 Lattimore (disambiguation)